Fraticelli is an Italian surname, meaning little friar. Outside of Italy, the surname is most prevalent in Puerto Rico and the U.S.

Notable people with this surname include:

 Migdalia Fraticelli (born 1950), Puerto Rican judge, author, professor
 Danny Fraticelli (born 1977), Puerto Rican singer
 Franco Fraticelli (1928–2012), Italian film editor
 Luis S. Fraticelli (born 1961), Puerto Rican FBI agent

References